Mandy Minella was the defending champion, but she did not participate due to pregnancy. 

Emina Bektas won the title, defeating Maria Sanchez in straight sets in the final.

Seeds

Draw

Finals

Top half

Bottom half

References
Main Draw

Coleman Vision Tennis Championships - Singles